La Reverdie, stylized as "LaReverdie", is an Italian group performing polyphonic medieval and Renaissance music.

Group members

 Elisabetta de Mircovich - vocal, vielle
 Claudia Caffagni - vocal, lute, psaltery
 Livia Caffagni - vocal, flute, vielle
 Doron David Sherwin - vocal, cornett

Discography
 1990 - Bestiarium. Animals in the Music of the Middle Ages - Nuovo Era 6970, reedited with new track order as Cantus 9601
 1992 - Speculum amoris. Lyrique d'Amour médiéval, du Mysticisme à l'érotisme - Arcana A336 
 1993 - Guinevere, Yseut, Melusine. The heritage of Celtic womanhood in the Middle Ages - Giulia "Musica Antiqua" GS 201007
 1993 - O Tu Chara Sciença. Musique de la Pensée Médiévale - Arcana A29 - Arcana A332
 1994 - Laude di Sancta Maria. Veillée de chants de dévotion dans l'Italie des Communes - Arcana 34
 1995 - Suso in Italia Bella. Musique dans les cours & cloître de l'italie du Nord - Arcana A38 - Arcana A320
 1997 - Insula Feminarum. Résonances médiévales de la Féminité Celte - Arcana A311 
 1999 - Legenda Aurea. Laudes des Saints au Trecento italien - Arcana 304
 1998 - La Nuit de Saint Nicholas. La Reverdie et chant grégorien - Arcana A72
 1999 - Historia Sancti Eadmundi. De la liturgie dramatique au drame liturgique - Arcana A43
 2001 - La Reverdie en Concierto. Festival Internacional de Santander - RTVE Música 65131
 2001 - Nox-Lux. Musique française et anglaise des XIIIe et XIVe siècles - Arcana A 307
 2002 - Voyage en Italie - Arcana 317
 2003 - Hildegard Von Bingen: Sponsa regis. La Victoire de la Vierge dans l'œuvre d'Hildegard von Bingen. La Reverdie et chant de Saint Bernard - Arcana A314
 2005 - Jacopo da Bologna, Madrigali e Cacce - Arcana A327
 2006 - Guillaume Dufay, Missa Sancti Jacobi - Arcana A342
 2009 - Carmina Burana, sarcasmes sacrés - Arcana A353
 2013 - I Dodici Giardini, Arcana

Festivals
La Reverdie have performed in numerous early music festivals. An incomplete list is given here:

 Festival Cusiano di Musica Antica (Orta San Giulio 1987, 1988, 1991, 1992, 1994,1995, 1997, 2000, 2003, 2007)
 Il Canto delle Pietre (Autunno Musicale di Como 1990, 1993, 1994, 1996, 1998, 2001, 2007)
  (1992, 2000)
 Festival van Vlaanderen (Brussels, 1992, 1993, 1995, 2005, 2007)
 Netwerk voor Oude Muziek (Utrecht, 1994, 2004)
 Festival de Mùsica antiga (Barcelona, 1995)
 Gesellschaft der Musikfreunde (Vienna, 1996)
 Semana de Musica Antigua (Burgos, 1997)
 Festival de San Sebastian (2009)
 Rhein-Renaissance ‘97 (Cologne 1997)
 Rencontres Internationales de Musique Médiévale (Le Thoronet)
 Festival Musicale Estense (Modena 1999, 2002, 2003, 2004, 2007)
 Settembre Musica (Turin, 1997, 1999)
 MiTo (Milan/Turin 2006)
  Trigonale (Austria, 2009)
 I Concerti del Quirinale (2002)
 Settimane Musicali di Stresa (2002, 2009)
 Festival Musique en Catalogne Romane (Perpignano, 2004)
 Festival Pergolesi-Spontini (Jesi, 2005)
 Ravenna Festival (2005, 2007, 2015)
 York Early Music Festival (2008)

References

External links
LaReverdie website

Italian musical groups
Mixed early music groups